William Goodchild (born 3 April 1964) is a composer, orchestrator and conductor who produces music for film, television and the concert hall.

Biography
Born in Northampton, England to an Australian-born father, the late Ronald Goodchild, (formerly Suffragan Bishop of Kensington), and an English mother, Jean Ross, William Goodchild was educated at the Royal College of Music (1970–1974) where he was a Junior Exhibitioner, studying violin and piano. After gaining a music scholarship at St Paul's School (1974–1981), William Goodchild obtained a Bachelor's degree with Honors in music at the University of East Anglia (1982–1985). He also holds a Diploma of Licentiate in Pianoforte from the Guildhall School of Music and Drama (1989). He is a member of the British Academy of Songwriters, Composers and Authors, and the MCPS-PRS Alliance. He studied conducting with Richard Hickox, John Lubbock, and George Hurst, and piano with Sidney Harrison and John York. His passion for film composition began when working as a musical assistant to British composer Edward Williams, preparing scores and conducting sessions on television projects for Williams. William Goodchild also teaches Music for Film and Television at the University of Bristol, gives seminars on Music for Film for organizations such as Music Industry Education and Wildscreen Festival, and was invited to teach in 2011 for Wildeye International School of Wildlife Filmmaking. In May 2010, he worked on a Music for Film project with the BBC Concert Orchestra and twenty-seven young musicians as part of the Bristol Festival of Nature 2010. Goodchild's sound recording studio is in Bristol.

Personal life
In 1987, William Goodchild met Rachel Swan. The two were married by Goodchild’s father, Ronald Goodchild, in Bristol, England in 1990. They have two daughters: Rosa Goodchild, who is a photographer, and Eleanor Goodchild, who studies education at Cardiff University.

Compositions

William Goodchild's compositions include original music for natural history and history documentaries, radio drama and a variety of commercial work. Recent broadcast commissions include Wild Amazon (2010) – a two-part series for the National Geographic Channel and Animal Planet, Wild Russia (2009) – a six-part series for the National Geographic Channel and Animal Planet, Snow Monkeys (2009) for BBC Natural World, Lobo – the Wolf that Changed America (2008) – a Natural World production for the BBC and WNET narrated by David Attenborough; Humpbacks – from Fire to Ice (2008) for the Australian Broadcasting Corporation and the National Geographic Society narrated by David Attenborough; Athens – the Truth about Democracy (2007) – a two-part history feature for Channel 4 produced by Lion TV and presented by Bettany Hughes; A Man among Bears (2008) – a natural history feature for Five and National Geographic Channel produced by Aqua Vita Films; and Peter Scott – a Passion for Nature (2006) – produced by Available Light Productions for BBC Two. Current commissions include Secrets of the Arabian Nights (2010) – directed by Mark Fielder and Lizzie White for Quickfire Media for BBC 4/2 broadcast in Autumn/Winter 2010.

William Goodchild works with a number of international and national orchestras including the Royal Philharmonic Orchestra, the BBC Concert Orchestra and the London Metropolitan Orchestra. He has recorded at many of the major London recording studios including Abbey Road Studios, Associated Independent Recording, Angel Recording Studios, and CTS Lansdowne Studios. As a conductor and orchestrator he has undertaken projects for the BBC including natural history series such as Nature's Great Events, Wild China, Ganges, Europe – a Natural History, Journey of Life and Wild New World, and has recorded for Sony Classical Records, Universal Records, and CBS Masterworks.

He has collaborated with international solo artists as diverse as guitarist John Williams (with whom he has recorded a number of albums), Andy Sheppard, members of the Maggini Quartet, Natalia Lomeiko, Alasdair Malloy, O-Duo, Tom Jones, and most recently Roni Size and Reprazent. In 2016, William Goodchild was appointed Conductor and Musical Director of Bristol Symphony Orchestra. He is also Guest Conductor with Bristol Ensemble. He performs regularly with both orchestras at St George's Bristol and Colston Hall.

Film and television music (2006–2015)

Wild Costa Rica (2015) - Wildlife documentary for Animal Planet; Produced by Warehouse 51 Productions; Producer/Director Ian Marsh
Return of the Giant Killers: Africa's Lion Kings (2015) - Wildlife documentary for BBC Natural World; Produced by Icon Films; Producer/ Director Steve Gooder
Timeshift: Castles - Britain's Fortified History (2014) for BBC4; Producer/Director Ben Southwell 
Africa's Fishing Leopards (2014) - Wildlife documentary for BBC Natural World. Produced by "Icon Films". Producer/ Director Steve Gooder
The Man Who Turned into a Sofa (2014); BBC Radio 4 Afternoon Drama; Written by Polly Peters, Andrew Fusek Peters and Rosalind Jana Peters; Produced by Tim Dee 
 Beavers Behaving Badly (2014); Wildlife documentary for BBC Natural World. Produced by BBC Natural History Unit. Producer/Director David Johnson 
Africa's Giant Killers (2014). Wildlife documentary for BBC Natural World. Produced by Icon Films. Producer/ Director Rob Sullivan 
Ultimate Honey Badger (2014). Wildlife documentary for National Geographic International. Produced by Earth Touch, Durban. Producer/Director: Jess Reiss 
Get Rich or Die Mining (2013). An adventure documentary for National Geographic International. Produced by RDF Television. Producer/ Director: David Johnson 
Leopards: 21st Century Cats (2013). Natural history documentary for BBC Natural World. Produced by Parthenon Entertainment/Sky Vision. Director: Simon Nash
"Dino Crab (2013). Natural History documentary for National Geographic International. Produced by  Parthenon Entertainment/Sky Vision. Director: Phil Coles 
Shocking Sharks (2013). Natural history documentary for National Geographic International. Produced by Parthenon Entertainment/Sky Vision. Director: Phil Coles 
Wild Hawaii (2012). Natural history documentary for Animal Planet. Produced by Parthenon Entertainment/Sky Vision. Director: Simon Nash 
Wild Appalachia (2012). Natural history documentary for Animal Planet. Produced by Parthenon Entertainment/ Sky Vision. Director: Simon Nash 
Walking Through History (2012). History documentary for Channel 4. Produced by Wildfire TV. Series Producer: David Johnson. Presenter: Tony Robinson
Jungle Gremlins of Java (2012). Natural history documentary for BBC Natural World. Produced by "Icon Films. Producer/ Director: Steve Gooder. 
Serengeti – Dangerous Journey (in production 2011) – Natural History documentary for National Geographic International – Produced by  Parthenon Entertainment – Director: Kate Dart
Nordic Wild (in production 2011) – Natural history series for National Geographic International and Animal Planet – Produced by Parthenon Entertainment
Chimps of the Lost Gorge (2011) – Natural history documentary for BBC Natural World and Animal Planet. Produced and directed by Verity White.
Clash of the Tiger Queens (2010) – Natural history documentary for broadcast on National Geographic International. Produced by Amanda Theunissen for Parthenon Entertainment, Directed by Melanie Price.
Secrets of the Arabian Nights (2010) – Directed by Mark Fielder and Lizzie White for Quickfire Media for BBC 4/2.
Miracle in the Marshes of Iraq (2010) – Directed by David Johnson and produced by Aqua Vita Films for BBC Natural World.
Kingdom of the Forest (in production, 2010) – Natural history documentary for National Geographic International. Produced by Parthenon Entertainment. Director: Joanne Lunt
Japan's Hidden Secrets (2009) – Natural history documentary,  Parthenon Entertainment Ltd. for the National Geographic Channel; Produced by Amanda Theunissen; Directed by Dan Habershon Butcher.
Wild Russia (2009) – Natural history series (6 × 50 minutes),  Parthenon Entertainment Ltd. for the National Geographic Channel and Animal Planet. Series Produced by Amanda Theunissen; Directed by Dan Habershon-Butcher.
Snow Monkeys (2009) – Natural history, BBC Natural World and Animal Planet. Produced and Directed by Ian Gray; Series Produced by Tim Martin
Humpbacks – from Fire to Ice (January 2008) – Natural history; Kohola Pty Ltd, Queensland for the Australian Broadcasting Corporation and National Geographic. Produced and Directed by Ross Isaacs; Narrated by David Attenborough; (Co-composer with Barnaby Taylor)
Lobo – the Wolf that Changed America (April 2008) – Natural history, Brian Leith Productions for BBC Natural World and WNET. Produced by Brian Leith; Directed by Steve Gooder; Narrated by David Attenborough
SS Great Britain (April 2008) – Television, Radio and Internet advertising campaign; Fanatic Design for ITV
A Man among Bears (January 2008) – Natural history; Aqua Vita Films for Five and National Geographic Channel. Produced by Bernard Walton; Directed by Dominick French
Athens – the Truth about Democracy (May 2007); 2-part history series, Lion TV] for Channel 4. Directed by Timothy Copestake; Presented by Bettany Hughes
Lilacs (April 2007); Russian feature film on the life of Sergei Rachmaninoff; Co-composer with Dan Jones
Fresh Fishing – the Carp (February 2007); Swim Films Ltd for commercial DVD release. Produced and Directed by Moira Mann.
A Man Among Wolves (February 2007) – Natural History documentary; Aqua Vita Films for Five and National Geographic. Produced by Bernard Walton; Co-composer with Barnaby Taylor.
WorldSkills Olympics 2011 (January 2007) – Signature Theme; VET, London
Peter Scott – a Passion for Nature (October 2006) – Natural history;  Available Light Productions for BBC Two. Produced and directed by Sarah Pitt; Narrated by David Attenborough
Ancient Worlds Brought to Life (April 2006) – 3-part history series for commercial DVD release, Doordarshan Television for Reader's Digest. Directed by Harriet Smith.

Orchestration and conducting (2004–2015)

Interplay Series 'Bill Evans and the impressionists' (2014) featuring the Kate Williams Trio with Oli Hayhurst - double bass, Tristan Mailliot - drums and conductor William Goodchild, Milton Court Concert Hall, London
Monsters Dark Continent (2014) - Feature film, Composer: Neil Davidge, Bristol Ensemble, Christchurch Studios, Bristol
Heart - Feature Documentary (2013), Composer: Justin Nicholls; Bristol Ensemble, Christchurch Studios, Bristol
African cats (2013) - 3-part natural history series for Disney Nature; Series Producer: Keith Scholey; Composer: David Poore; Bristol Ensemble, Real World Studios
Wild Arabia (2012)- 3-part Natural History series for BBC; Series Producer: Brian Leith; Composer: Barnaby Taylor; BBC Concert Orchestra, Abbey Road Studios, London
Frai (2012) - Feature film; Director: Leslie Rogers; Producer: Jack Paulson; Composer: David Poore; Bristol Ensemble, Christchurch Studios, Bristol
The Truth About Lions (2011) – 2-part natural history series for the BBC. Composer: David Poore, Christchurch Studios, Bristol
Mountain Gorillas (2010) – 3-part natural history series for the BBC: Composer: David Poore, Christchurch Studios, Bristol
The Man Who Stopped the Desert (2010) – One-hour feature documentary produced by 1080 Films, Composer: David Poore, Bristol Ensemble, Christchurch Studios, Bristol
The Great Rift (2010) – 3-part natural history series for the BBC – Series Producer: Phil Chapman, Composer: Barnaby Taylor, BBC Concert Orchestra, Abbey Road Studios, London.
Nature's Great Events (2009) – Award-winning 6-part natural history series for BBC1; BBC Concert Orchestra, Abbey Road Studios, London, England. Narrated by Sir David Attenborough. Music composed by Ben Salisbury and Barnaby Taylor, orchestrated and conducted by William Goodchild.
Nature's Great Events Live (2009) – Concert performance featuring footage from the series with live orchestral accompaniment from the BBC Concert Orchestra and narrated by Sir David Attenborough. Music composed by Ben Salisbury and Barnaby Taylor, orchestrated and conducted by William Goodchild
Music and Chance (2009) – Concert given by the BBC Concert Orchestra at the Queen Elizabeth Hall with pieces by Andy Sheppard and Barnaby Taylor. Orchestrated by William Goodchild.
Drawer of Dreams (2009) – Concert performance featuring Emerald Ensemble and Cirque Bijou, orchestrated by William Goodchild, conducted by Charles Hazlewood.
Catching the Impossible – 8-part angling series, Emerald Ensemble, Composer: David Poore, Christchurch Studios, Bristol, England
Wild China (November 2008) – 6-part natural history series for BBC Two; BBC Concert Orchestra, Angel Recording Studios, London, England
Ganges (May 2007)- 3-part natural history series for BBC Two; Royal Philharmonic Orchestra, Maida Vale Studios, London, England.
Life on Earth – an Orchestral Suite by Edward Williams (April 2007) – Commercial Compact Disc release. The Bristol Ensemble at St George's Bristol, England.
Europe – A Natural History, January 2005) – 4-part natural history series for BBC Two and ORF (broadcaster), BBC Concert Orchestra, Angel Recording Studios, London, England.
Journey of Life (September 2004) – 5-part natural history series for BBC Two; BBC Concert Orchestra, Angel Recording Studios, London, England.
Holy Cow (January 2004; natural history) – documentary film for the Discovery Channel, Emerald Ensemble, St Albans Church, Weston-super-Mare, England.

Awards
Braving Iraq (a.k.a. 'Miracle in the Marshes of Iraq') an Aqua Vita Films and WNET Production won the Gold World Medal in the Environment and Ecology category at The New York Festival's International Film and Television Awards in Las Vegas in 2011. Music composed by William Goodchild.
As orchestrator and conductor, William Goodchild was a key contributor to the soundtrack of Wild China: Heart of Dragon which was awarded an Emmy for Music and Sound in September 2009.
The Wolf that Changed America (2008), a Natural World production for the BBC and Thirteen/WNET (New York) narrated by Sir David Attenborough, was awarded the Jury's Special Prize at the 2008 Wildscreen Festival in 2008, and the Outstanding Achievement Award at the Jackson Hole Wildlife Film Festival in 2009 at Jackson Hole. Music composed by William Goodchild.

References

Conductor, Bristol Music Club Orchestra
Conductor, John Williams – Echoes Of London

External links
 

1964 births
Living people
People educated at St Paul's School, London
Alumni of the Guildhall School of Music and Drama
Alumni of the University of East Anglia
English film score composers
English male film score composers